Stover Country Park is an area of woodland park  north of Newton Abbot in the parish of Teigngrace,  Devon, within the former grounds of Stover House.

History
The park is a small part of the originally 80,000 acre estate of James Templer, who built Stover House (now occupied by Stover School) with his fortune made building dockyards.

The park was designated a Site of Special Scientific Interest (SSSI) in 1984 by the Nature Conservancy Council (now English Nature) due to its rare dragonfly species and invertebrates, and was added to the register of Historic Parks and Gardens in 1995.  It was then declared a Local Nature Reserve in 2001.

Features

The park has a number of special features including an aerial walkway, the original Stover gatehouse, a poetry trail, and interpretation centre.

Interpretation centre
The interpretation centre opened in 2000, and has displays about the wildlife within the park, including interactive displays and remote cameras, and classroom facilities for groups.

Aerial walkway
Opened in 2003, the walkway is raised above the ground and follows a  route through the woodland's lower canopy.  This allows a closer view of the mature oak trees, as well as lakes and ponds below.  it also features interpretation boards and children's poems and art carved in to the rails.

Poetry trail
There is a trail dedicated to former Poet Laureate Ted Hughes, featuring his poems etched in granite posts around the site, and all relating the natural world, some of which are illustrated by Raymond Briggs.  The trail was installed in 2006.

References

External links
 Official website

Historic estates in Devon